Australia is a Cuban village and consejo popular ("people's council", i.e. hamlet) of the municipality of Jagüey Grande, Matanzas Province. It has an estimated population of 8,850.

History
The village, founded in 1862, is in a sugar growing area and "dominated by the old, out-of-service sugar factory's chimney, with "Australia" written prominently down its length." The village is named after the factory, the Central Australia, which like others in the area were named after continents.

The village was the first sugar town in Cuba to stop using slave labour, and served as Fidel Castro's base of operations during the 1961 Bay of Pigs invasion.

Geography
Located 2 km south of Jagüey Grande, Australia lies next to Zapata Swamp (Ciénaga de Zapata). It is served by the A1 motorway (linking Havana to Santa Clara) at the exit of Jagüey.

See also

Agramonte (village)
List of cities in Cuba
Municipalities of Cuba

References

External links
 Historical infos about Australia (guije.com)

Populated places in Matanzas Province
Jagüey Grande
Populated places established in 1862
1862 establishments in Cuba